Gleneden Beach State Recreation Site is a state park administered by the Oregon Parks and Recreation Department in the U.S. state of Oregon. The park is fee-free.

Open year-round, the  park has picnic tables, a group picnic area, and restrooms. Road access is from U.S. Highway 101, which passes through the nearby community of Gleneden Beach. Picnic tables have been set up in the woods near the parking area and in a meadow above an ocean bluff. A path along the edge of the bluff offers views of the ocean; other paths lead down to the beach.

See also
 List of Oregon state parks

References

State parks of Oregon
Parks in Lincoln County, Oregon